Stash Tea Company is a privately owned specialty tea and herbal tea company with its headquarters in Tigard, a suburb of Portland in Oregon, USA.

History 

Stash Tea was founded by Steve Lee, Dave Leger, and Steven Smith (who also co-founded Steven Smith Teamaker and founded Tazo) in 1972. The company originally operated from an old Victorian-style house in Portland, supplying loose herbal teas and bulk herbs to natural food stores. Stash Tea broadened its focus to include bagged teas, and a full line of traditional, specialty blend herbal teas for fine restaurants.

According to the company, Stash Tea derives its name from tea folklore: tea was once a valuable commodity, traditionally transported by clipper ships. A ship’s captain was typically presented with the finest teas for his personal use, which was regarded as his stash.

In 1993, Stash was acquired by Yamamotoyama Tea Company.

Products 
The company offers speciality teas and tea products. In November 2019, Stash company released a promotional series, called "Little Bag of Crazy" about their new vision on tea. The series has 20 episodes in total; in each the main roles are played by fruits or herbs.

Store 
In 2005, Stash Tea opened a retail store in the Bridgeport Village shopping complex in Tigard, Oregon.

See also 
 Tazo

References

External links
 Official Website
 Wholesale Website

Tea brands in the United States
Tea companies of the United States
Companies based in Tigard, Oregon
Food and drink companies based in Portland, Oregon
American companies established in 1972 
Certified B Corporations in the Food & Beverage Industry
Food and drink companies established in 1972 
Privately held companies based in Oregon
1972 establishments in Oregon